This is a list of years in motoring.

List

Further reading